John Pinch may refer to:

John Pinch the Younger (1796–1849), Bath architect
John Pinch the Elder (1769–1827), Bath architect
John Pinch (rugby) (1870–1946), rugby player